Alberto Esquer Gutiérrez (born 7 November 1978) is a Mexican politician from the Citizens' Movement (formerly from the National Action Party). From 2009 to 2012 he served as Deputy of the LXI Legislature of the Mexican Congress representing Jalisco.

References

1978 births
Living people
Politicians from Jalisco
National Action Party (Mexico) politicians
Citizens' Movement (Mexico) politicians
21st-century Mexican politicians
University of Guadalajara alumni
Members of the Congress of Jalisco
Members of the Chamber of Deputies (Mexico) for Jalisco